Neptunium (IV) oxalate is an inorganic compound, a salt of neptunium and oxalic acid with the chemical formula Np(CO). The compound is slightly soluble in water, forms crystalline hydrates—green crystals.

Synthesis
Neptunium(IV) oxalate is formed by the oxalic acid precipitation of neptunium (IV) solutions:

Physical properties
Neptunium(IV) oxalate forms a crystalline hydrate of the composition Np(C2O4)2 • 6H2O with green crystals.

It is insoluble in acetone, and slightly soluble in water.

Chemical properties
Neptunium(IV) oxalate decomposes on heating:

Applications
Neptunium(IV) oxalate is used as an intermediate product in the purification of neptunium.

References

Neptunium compounds
Oxalates